Lázaro Rivas Scull (4 April 1975 – 22 December 2013) was a Cuban wrestler who competed in the 1996 Summer Olympics, in the 2000 Summer Olympics, and in the 2004 Summer Olympics. He was born in Havana and died in San José de las Lajas.

References

External links
 

1975 births
2013 deaths
Sportspeople from Havana
Olympic wrestlers of Cuba
Wrestlers at the 1996 Summer Olympics
Wrestlers at the 2000 Summer Olympics
Cuban male sport wrestlers
Wrestlers at the 2004 Summer Olympics
Olympic silver medalists for Cuba
Olympic medalists in wrestling
World Wrestling Championships medalists
Medalists at the 2000 Summer Olympics
Wrestlers at the 1999 Pan American Games
Wrestlers at the 2003 Pan American Games
Pan American Games gold medalists for Cuba
Pan American Games medalists in wrestling
Medalists at the 1999 Pan American Games
20th-century Cuban people
21st-century Cuban people